The legislative assembly election was held on 28 November 2018 to elect members of the 40 constituencies in Mizoram. Mizo National Front won 26 seats in the election. This was the first time that Congress does not have any government in any of the states in Northeast India.

Background 
The tenure of Mizoram Legislative Assembly was due to end on 15 December 2018.

Four high-profile leaders of the Congress including the Speaker of the Legislative Assembly in Mizoram defected to the BJP before the polls.

Schedule 
The Election Commission of India has announced the poll dates on 6 October 2018. It was held in single phase on 28 November 2018. The result was declared on 11 December 2018.

Exit polls

Quit Notice to CEO

On the eve of the election, Quit notice was given to Chief Election Officer SB Sashank because of two issues, one involving the deployment of central forces around Reang tribals living in Tripura Camps who are voters for Elections in Mizoram. While the State government wanted them to travel to Mizoram, groups representing Reang tribals wanted them to vote from Tripura camps.
Secondly the CEO Shashank alleged interference by Principal Secretary (Home) Lalnunmawia Chuaungo in preparations for the polls scheduled on 28 November. He wrote to the EC in the last week of October, mentioning an active role played by the state Home Department in this interference. The Election Commission of India  issued orders to the state government to remove Chuaungo with immediate effect. Over 40,000 people mobilized by a co-ordination committee headed by the  Young Mizo Association compromising Mizo Upa Pawl (Mizo senior citizens association), Mizo Hmeichhe Insuihkhawm Pawl (Mizo women organisation) and two student bodies took to the streets in Aizawl demanding removal of SB Sashank and reinstatement of Lalnunmawia Chaungo. Eventually the Election Commission recalled SB Sashank and appointed Mr Ashish Kundra as the New Chief Election Officer.

Result

Constituency results

See also 
 Elections in India
 2018 elections in India

References

External links
Election Commission of India

Mizoram
2018
2018